Myer Caselberg (1841 – 23 June 1922) was a New Zealand storekeeper, businessman and local politician. He was born in Gaorah, Poland in 1841. He was Mayor of Masterton from 1886 to 1888.

Wairarapa Farmers Co-operative Association
Caselberg formed this company in 1892 with a capital of £100,000. It was formed to own his existing businesses. By 1908 it was the largest inland trading organisation in the North Island of New Zealand. Principally a stock and station agency, its activities included eight retail stores, cheese and butter factories, motor vehicle dealerships etc.

WFCA was acquired by Wright Stephenson in 1959 and is now part of PGG Wrightson.

External links
YouTube Pictorial history of the W.F.C.A. Building Pahiatua 1896 to 2015

References

1841 births
1922 deaths
New Zealand stock and station agents
New Zealand businesspeople
New Zealand people of Polish-Jewish descent
Jewish New Zealand politicians
Polish emigrants to New Zealand
Emigrants from the Russian Empire to New Zealand
Mayors of Masterton